Type 80 Air-to-Ship Missile (80式空対艦誘導弾, ASM-1) is an air-launched anti-ship missile developed by Mitsubishi Heavy Industries. It entered service with the Japan Air Self-Defense Force in 1980. The major launch platforms for the Type 80 are the Mitsubishi F-1, JASDF F-4EJ Kai and Mitsubishi F-2.

The missile is primarily intended as an air-launched coastal defence weapon. In fact it is somewhat more capable than this, able to engage both sea and land targets such as buildings and bridges. The Type 80 also serves as the basis of several other weapons; it forms part of the ground-launched SSM-1 system and was also developed into the Type 88 SSM (Surface-to-Ship Missile), the Type 90 SSM (Ship-to-Ship Missile), and the 91 and 93 ASMs (Air-to-Ship Missile).

The ASM-1 will be replaced by the ASM-3 currently in development.

See also

 Type 88 Surface-to-Ship Missile
 Type 90 Ship-to-Ship Missile
 ASM-2
 ASM-3

External links
https://fas.org/man/dod-101/sys/missile/row/type-80.htm

Anti-ship missiles of Japan
Military equipment introduced in the 1980s